is a volleyball arcade video game developed by Video System and originally published by Taito on October 19, 1994. A follow-up to Hyper V-Ball on Super Nintendo Entertainment System, it was first launched for Neo Geo MVS (arcade) and later ported to Neo Geo CD. It is the final installment in the Super Volleyball series. It is also the only volleyball game released on the Neo Geo.

In the game, players have the choice to compete across any of the game modes available with either AI-controlled opponents or against other human players. Headed by Aero Fighters Assault producer Koji Furukawa, Power Spikes II was created by most of the same team that would later work on several projects at Video System such as later entries in the Aero Fighters franchise. Though it was initially launched for the Neo Geo MVS and Neo Geo CD, the title has since been re-released through download services for various consoles. It received mixed reception from critics and reviewers alike since its initial launch.

Gameplay 

Power Spikes II is a five-on-five volleyball game similar to previous volleyball titles from Video System, where players take control of any team in a series of matches on indoor courts. Most of the rules from the sport are present in the title, though they can be modified in the options menu along with other settings that alters the matches. The player controls a team of five players, two at the net and three in back. The player serves the ball into play by pressing the same action button twice. During gameplay, players are able to apply skills such as serve, pass, set, attack and block the incoming ball for offensive and defensive purposes respectively in order to score points. Some of the gameplay options found within the game include tournaments mode where either male or female teams must be faced in order to become the emerging champion. Returning from Hyper V-Ball is Hyper Mode as "Hyper League", which is a league for robots and takes place in futuristic courts.

Development and release 
Power Spikes II was created by most of the same team that would later work on several projects at Video System such as later entries in the Aero Fighters franchise, with Koji Furukawa serving as producer. Takumi Matsui served as chief designer, while the soundtrack was composed by Soshi Hosoi. Several other people also collaborated in its development. The game was first released by Taito for the Neo Geo MVS and was later ported to the Neo Geo CD by Video System. Prior to launch, the project went under the name Super Volley '94. The title has received multiple re-releases in recent years on various digital distribution platforms such as the Nintendo eShop, PlayStation Network and Xbox Live by the eventual copyright holder for the game, Hamster Corporation.

Reception 

Power Spikes II received mixed reception from critics and reviewers alike since launch. The Nintendo Switch version holds a 50% on the video game review aggregator GameRankings.

AllGames Kyle Knight felt mixed in regards to multiple aspects of Power Spikes II, commending the visual presentation of "Hyper League" mode but panned the visual department of regular mode for being poor and criticized the audio design. However, Knight noted that the gameplay in regular mode was more enjoyable than that of "Hyper League" mode but ultimately regarded the game as disappointing. Hobby Consolas Sonia Herranz reviewed the Neo Geo CD version, commending the ability to play doubles and number of leagues but felit mixed in regards to the audiovisual presentation, criticizing the low amount of teams per leagues, slow pacing and limited movement, stating that the title "neither impresses with its appearance, nor captivates with its playability." MAN!ACs Martin Gaksch regarded the addition of "Hyper League" as interesting but felt it was not as refined as Super Baseball 2020. Gaksch criticized the viewing perspective for being suboptimal and restrictive, as well as the graphics for being unimaginative and sound, stating that "what began with great play eight years ago with great volleyball ends quite embarrassingly with Video System's second Power Spikes."

Nintendo Lifes Dave Frear reviewed the Nintendo Switch re-release, stating that "Power Spikes II is a little too simple to offer long term appeal." Frear commended the visual presentation but regarded it as simple when compared to other released on Neo Geo and criticized its simplified take on volleyball. Superjuegos Javier Iturrioz also reviewed the Neo Geo CD version, criticizing graphics for the small size of sprites, lack of variety and forced screen scrolling. Iturrioz also felt that the game did not take advantage of the CD format in terms of audio design. He commended the inclusion of special moves when playing "Hyper League" mode but criticized the lack of additional actions during gameplay. German magazine Video Games stated in their review that "With this volleyball simulation programmed by Videosystems, Taito is now producing its first Neo-Geo product. The Japanese, however, knew why they waited so long, because Powerspikes 2 is anything but substantial in terms of fun."

Notes

References

External links 
 Power Spikes II at GameFAQs
 Power Spikes II at Giant Bomb
 Power Spikes II at Killer List of Videogames
 Power Spikes II at MobyGames

1994 video games
ACA Neo Geo games
Arcade video games
Head-to-head arcade video games
Multiplayer and single-player video games
Neo Geo games
Neo Geo CD games
Nintendo Switch games
PlayStation Network games
PlayStation 4 games
SNK games
Taito arcade games
Video games scored by Soshi Hosoi
Video System games
Volleyball video games
Windows games
Xbox One games
Video games developed in Japan
Hamster Corporation games